Hallsville is an unincorporated community located adjacent to the Northeast Cape Fear River in Duplin County, North Carolina, United States.

History 
Hallsville was served by a post office from 1828 until March 1930; its first postmaster was Zebulon Simpson. In 1736, Duplin County (then upper New Hanover County) was the destination of several hundred Ulster Scots (Scotch-Irish) and a handful of Swiss Protestants. They settled on a plot of land, 71,160 acres between the N. E. Cape Fear River and Black River, obtained from the Crown by Henry McCulloh Esq. of London - this tract included what would become Hallsville.

The namesake of the Hall family, which had been living in the area since the mid-1700s, Hallsville was once the site of a plantation owned by Thomas Hall. Hall, who was also a prominent dealer of turpentine, owned 51 slaves, making him one of the largest slaveholders in the county at that time.

Hallsville was the scene of a brief commotion when, on July 6, 1863, a retreating Federal cavalry detachment being pursued by Colonel Thorburn, the Confederate Commandant for the City of Wilmington, passed through. The Confederates had hoped that they could trap the Federals at the river, but they had already crossed before any plan could materialize. The 1890 Census puts the population of Hallsville at a mere 24 persons. In 1899, however, Hallsville became the upper-most loading point for the steamship Saint Peter, which made runs to the port of Wilmington.  The primary export of Hallsville during this period was lumber and naval stores. The community, now being serviced by a steamship, saw a sudden, although marginal, population increase. The upper stretch of the "Northeast River", however, could be quite treacherous and was not conducive to frequent travel by steamship. When the Kinston Carolina Railroad Company laid track through the eastern portion of Duplin County in 1916, Hallsville was bypassed. With the incorporation of nearby Beulaville at the advantageous intersection of several major thoroughfares the following year, the importance of Hallsville was negated and the remainder of the community's population began dispersing, save but a few families.

Notable residents 

 William Hall (1741-1825) was a merchant and prominent citizen of Hallsville, North Carolina. Hall served as a Justice of the Peace in Duplin County, North Carolina in 1776.
Parker (P.D.) Robbins (1834-1917) Robbins, a black descendant of a Chowan Indian chief, fought for the North during the Civil War; he was a sergeant in a colored cavalry unit. After the war, he returned to Bertie County and was chosen to represent it at the State Constitutional Convention. Afterwards, he served in the State Legislature (1869-1870) and became a postmaster at Harrellsville. An industrious man, Robbins was also a keen farmer and inventor, obtaining patents for two pieces of farm machinery. Robbins moved to Hallsville around 1879. There, he established a saw mill and constructed the steamboat Saint Peter, which he operated the remainder of his life. Robbins is buried in Duplin County.
 James Sprunt (1818-1884) Born in Perth, Scotland, Sprunt had ambitions to emigrate to New York to teach. En route, however, his ship was damaged in a storm and forced to make an unscheduled stop in Wilmington, NC for repairs. While in Wilmington, Sprunt learned that the community of Hallsville was seeking a teacher. Sprunt accepted the position, teaching in Hallsville for five years before transferring to Grove Academy in nearby Kenansville. Sprunt served as the pastor for the 20th North Carolina Infantry during the Civil War, resigning in July 1863 due to dysentery. His post-war positions included both Duplin County Register of Deeds and County Clerk. Sprunt was also a successful botanist, selling many plants to the National Botanical Gardens in Washington, D.C. Sprunt is buried on a small bluff overlooking the Northeast Cape Fear River in Hallsville.

References

External links 
 Duplin history at Rootsweb.com

Geography of Duplin County, North Carolina